"I've Got You" is a song by American singer Marc Anthony, for his sixth studio album and his second English studio album Mended. The single is Anthony's worldwide international hit, and also the most successful single from the album. It was released on June 17, 2002. A Spanish version, "Te Tengo Aquí", was also recorded for the album.

Track listing

Charts
It charted on the US Billboard Hot 100 at No. 81. The single also charted within top 50 in 7 countries.

References

External links
 

2002 singles
2002 songs
Marc Anthony songs
Songs written by Cory Rooney
Columbia Records singles